Sugarloaf Hill is a mountain peak located in the Knockmealdown Mountains on the border between County Tipperary and County Waterford.

See also
 List of mountains in Ireland
 Sugarloaf (mountain)

References 

Hewitts of Ireland
Mountains and hills of County Waterford
Mountains and hills of County Tipperary
Mountains under 1000 metres